This is demographic history of Serbian Banat.

1910
According to the 1910 census, the population of the territory of present-day Serbian Banat numbered 566,400 people, including: 
 Serbs = 229,568 (40.53%) 
 Germans = 125,374 (22.14%) 
 Hungarians = 108,662 (19.18%) 
 Romanians = 73,303 (12.94%) 
 Slovaks = 16,223 (2.86%) 
 Croats = 3,685 (0.65%)

1921

According to the 1921 census, the population of Serbian Banat numbered 561,958 people, including: 
 Serbs and Croats = 240,213 (42.75%) 
 Germans = 126,530 (22.52%) 
 Hungarians = 98,471 (17.52%) 
 Romanians = 67,897 (12.08%)

Of the 169 communes in the Serbian Banat, 61 were predominantly South Slav-speaking, 29 German, 27 Magyar, 24 Romanian, 3 Slovak-Czech and 25 mixed.

By religion, the population of Serbian Banat in 1921 included:
 Eastern Orthodox Christians = 306,414 (54.53%) 
 Roman Catholics = 209,370 (37.26%) 
 Protestants = 39,226 (6.98%)

1931

In 1931, the population of Serbian Banat numbered 585,579 people, including: 
 Serbs = 261,123 (44.59%) 
 Germans = 120,541 (20.58%) 
 Hungarians = 95,867 (16.37%) 
 Romanians = 62,365 (10.65%) 
 Slovaks = 17,900 (3.06%) 
 Croats = 12,546 (2.14%)

1948

In 1948, the population of Serbian Banat numbered 601,626 people, including: 
 Serbs = 358,067 (59.62%) 
 Hungarians = 110,446 (18.35%) 
 Romanians = 55,678 (9.25%) 
 Slovaks = 20,685 (3.44%) 
 Germans = 17,522 (2.91%) 
 Croats = 8,727 (1.45%)

1953

In 1953, the population of Serbian Banat numbered 617,163 people, including: 
 Serbs = 374,258 (60.64%) 
 Hungarians = 112,683 (18.26%) 
 Romanians = 55,094 (8.93%) 
 Slovaks = 21,229 (3.44%) 
 Croats = 10,700 (1.73%)

1961

In 1961, the population of Serbian Banat numbered 655,868 people, including: 
 Serbs = 423,837 (64.62%) 
 Hungarians = 111,944 (17.07%) 
 Romanians = 54,447 (8.3%) 
 Slovaks = 22,306 (3.4%) 
 Croats = 8,381 (1.28%)

1971

In 1971, the population of Serbian Banat numbered 666,559 inhabitants, including:
 Serbs = 434,810 (65.23%)
 Hungarians = 103,090 (15.47%)
 Romanians = 49,455 (7.42%)
 Slovaks = 22,173 (3.33%)
 Macedonians = 12,683 (1.90%)
 Yugoslavs = 10,795 (1.62%)
 Croats = 7,896 (1.18%)
 Montenegrins = 3,882 (0.58%)
 Slovenes = 1,521 (0.23%)

1981

In 1981, the population of Serbian Banat numbered 672,884 people, including: 
 Serbs = 424,765 (65.66%) 
 Hungarians = 90,445 (14.0%) 
 Romanians = 43,474 (6.74%) 
 Yugoslavs = 42,584 (6.6%) 
 Slovaks = 21,392 (3.31%)

1991

In 1991, the population of Serbian Banat numbered 648,390 people, including: 
 Serbs = 423,475 (65.31%) 
 Hungarians = 76,153 (11.74%) 
 Yugoslavs = 42,382 (6.55%) 
 Romanians = 35,935 (5.54%) 
 Slovaks = 19,903 (3.07%)

2002

According to 2002 census, the population of Serbian Banat (excluding City of Belgrade's settlements of Borča, Krnjača, Ovča, Padinska Skela, Kovilovo  and Besni Fok which are geographically part of Banat) numbered 616,202 people and was composed of:
 Serbs = 435,577 (70.69%)
 Hungarians = 62,890 (10.21%)
 Romanians = 27,661 (4.1%)
 Slovaks = 17,994 (2.7%)

2011

According to 2011 census, the population of Serbian Banat (excluding City of Belgrade's settlements of Borča, Krnjača, Ovča, Padinska Skela, Kovilovo  and Besni Fok which are geographically part of Banat) numbered 534,875 people and is composed of: 
 Serbs = 398,454 (74.49%)
 Hungarians = 52,892 (9.88%)
 Romanians = 22,353 (4.17%)
 Romani people = 18,547 (3.46%)
 Slovaks = 16,063 (3%)
 Macedonians = 7,236 (1.35%)

Notes

See also
Demographic history of Vojvodina
Demographic history of Serbia

History of Banat
Demographic history of Vojvodina